Ryan Kisor (born April 12, 1973) is an American jazz trumpeter.

A native of Sioux City, Iowa, Kisor learned trumpet from his father, Larry Kisor, and started playing in a local dance band (the Eddie Skeets Orchestra) at age ten. Kisor began classical trumpet lessons at age 12, met Clark Terry when he was 15 (attending his summer jazz camp), and played with all-star high school bands. In 1990, Kisor won the Thelonious Monk Institute's trumpet contest at the age of 17; Nicholas Payton and Marcus Printup were among the other contestants that year.   HIs younger brother Justin Kisor is also an accomplished jazz artist (trumpet) who he has performed numerous concerts and had record releases with Kisor.

Following this he was signed by Columbia Records, who released his first two albums, 1992's Minor Mutiny and 1993's On the One. Following this, Kisor entered the Manhattan School of Music, where he was a student of Lew Soloff among others. He has played in New York with the Mingus Big Band and the Michel Camilo Big Band, with Gerry Mulligan, Wynton Marsalis, Wycliffe Gordon, Horace Silver and Walter Blanding. Since 1994 he has been a member of the Jazz at Lincoln Center Orchestra, and has released many albums as a bandleader.

Discography

As leader 
 1992?: Minor Mutiny (Columbia, 1992)
 1993?: On the One (Columbia, 1993)
 1997: Battle Cry (Criss Cross, 1998)
 1998: The Usual Suspects (Fable/Lightyear, 1998)
 1998: Point of Arrival (Criss Cross, 2000)
 1999: Power Source (Criss Cross, 2001)
 1999: Kisor (Videoarts, 2000)
 2001?: Kisor II (Videoarts, 2001)
 2002: The Sidewinder (Videoarts, 2003)
 2002: Awakening (Criss Cross, 2003)
 2003: Donna Lee (Videoarts, 2004)
 2004: The Uptown Quintet, Live in New York (Cellar Live, 2005) – live recorded at Smoke (jazz club)
 2005: Ryan Kisor Quintet, This Is Ryan (Videoarts, 2005)
 2006: One Finger Snap  (Videoarts, 2006)
 2007: Conception: Cool and Hot  (Birds, 2008)
 2008: Ryan Kisor Quintet, Live at Smalls (SmallsLIVE, 2010) – live recorded at Smalls Jazz Club

As sideman 

With Wynton Marsalis and Lincoln Center Jazz Orchestra
 Blood On the Fields (Columbia, 1997)
 Live in Swing City, Swingin' with Duke (Columbia, 1999) – live
 Big Train (Columbia, 1999)
 Essentially Ellington 2000 (Warner Bros., 2000)
 Plays the Music of Duke Ellington (Brooks Brothers, 2004)
 A Love Supreme (Palmetto, 2004)
 Don't Be Afraid...The Music of Charles Mingus (Palmetto, 2005)
 Vitoria Suite (EmArcy, 2010)
 Portrait in Seven Shades (Jazz at Lincoln Center, 2010)
 The Abyssinian Mass (Blue Engine, 2016)
 The Music of John Lewis (Blue Engine, 2017)
 The Music of Wayne Shorter (Blue Engine, 2020)

With the Manhattan Jazz Orchestra
 Les Liaisons Dangereuses (Sweet Basil, 1992)
 A Night in Tunisia (Sweet Basil, 1993)
 Get It On (Sweet Basil, 1995)
 Paint It Black (Sweet Basil, 1996)
 Black Magic Woman (Sweet Basil, 1997)
 Hey Duke! (Videoarts, 1999)
 Some Skunk Funk (Videoarts, 2002)
 Birdland (Videoarts, 2004)

With David Matthews
 Watermelon Man (Sweet Basil, 1997)
 Furuhata Jazz in N.Y. (WEA, 1997)
 Mambo No. 5 (Sweet Basil, 1998)
 Back to Bach (Milestone, 2000)
 Impressions (Videoarts, 2002)
 The Girl from Ipanema (Videoarts, 2002)

With Mingus Big Band
 Nostalgia in Times Square (Dreyfus, 1993)
 Gunslinging Birds (Dreyfus, 1995)
 Live in Time (Dreyfus, 1996) – live
 Que Viva Mingus! (Dreyfus, 1997)

With others
 Ray Anderson, Big Band Record (Gramavision, 1994)
 Ehud Asherie, Lockout (Posi-Tone, 2007)
 Ralph Bowen, Keep the Change (Criss Cross, 2003)
 Michel Camilo, One More Once (Columbia, 1994)
 Carnegie Hall Jazz Band, The Carnegie Hall Jazz Band/Music Director Jon Faddis (Blue Note, 1996)
 Jesse Davis, Live at Smalls (SmallsLIVE, 2012) – live
 Michael Davis, Trumpets Eleven (Hip-Bone Music, 2003)
 Ivan Farmakovsky, Next to the Shadow (Boheme Music, 2009)
 Wycliffe Gordon, What You Dealin' With (Criss Cross, 2001)
 Jim Hall, Textures (Telarc, 1997) – rec. 1996
 Ian Hendrickson-Smith, Still Smokin'  (Sharp Nine, 2004)
 Mike LeDonne, Soulmates (Criss Cross, 1993)
 Mike Longo, Explosion (Consolidated Artists, 1999)
 Andy McKee, Sound Roots (Mapleshade, 1997)
 Pat Metheny, Secret Story (Geffen, 1992)
 Gerry Mulligan, Dragonfly (Telarc, 1995)
 Ted Nash, Presidential Suite: Eight Variations On Freedom (Motema, 2016)
 Melvin Rhyne, Stick to the Kick (Criss Cross, 1995)
 Herlin Riley, Watch What You're Doing (Criss Cross, 1999)
 Horace Silver, Jazz... Has... A Sense of Humor (Verve, 1999) – rec. 1998
 Steve Slagle, Alto Blue (SteepleChase, 1997)
 Grant Stewart, Tenor and Soul (Videoarts, 2005)
 Steve Swallow, Deconstructed (XtraWATT, 1997) – rec. 1996
 Bobby Watson, Tailor Made (Columbia, 1993)
 Michael Weiss, Soul Journey (Sintra, 2003)
 Paula West, Come What May (Hi Horse, 2001)
 Ben Wolfe, Live at Smalls (SmallsLIVE, 2010) – live
 Sam Yahel, Searchin'  (Naxos, 1997) – rec. 1996

References

[ Ryan Kisor] at Allmusic
Yanow, S. (2001). Trumpet Kings. In S. Yanow, Trumpet Kings (p. 222). San Francisco: Backbeat Books

American jazz trumpeters
American male trumpeters
1973 births
Living people
Jazz musicians from New York (state)
Manhattan School of Music alumni
Musicians from Iowa
People from Sioux City, Iowa
21st-century trumpeters
21st-century American male musicians
American male jazz musicians
Jazz at Lincoln Center Orchestra members
Mingus Big Band members
Criss Cross Jazz artists
Columbia Records artists